Robert Avedisian (December 26, 1937 – January 21, 2021), professionally known as Bob Avian, was an American choreographer, theatrical producer and director.

Biography
Born in New York City to an Armenian family in December 1937, Avian spent his early career dividing his time between dancing in such Broadway shows as West Side Story, Funny Girl, and Henry, Sweet Henry and working as a production assistant on projects like I Do! I Do! and Twigs. He first met Michael Bennett when they both appeared in the European tour of West Side Story in 1959, and over the course of the next two decades the two collaborated on Promises, Promises, Coco, Company, Follies, Seesaw, God's Favorite, A Chorus Line, Ballroom, and Dreamgirls, Avian's first credit as a solo producer. Additional Broadway credits include Putting It Together, Nowhere to Go But Up and the 2006 revival of A Chorus Line, which he directed.

In London's West End, Avian choreographed Follies, Martin Guerre, The Witches of Eastwick, Miss Saigon, and Sunset Boulevard, repeating the assignment for the Broadway productions of the latter two. He also staged Hey, Mr. Producer!, the Cameron Mackintosh tribute.

Personal
Avian was openly gay and survived by his husband Peter Pileski, and his sister, Laura Nabedian.

Awards and nominations
Awards
1976 Drama Desk Award for Outstanding Choreography – A Chorus Line
1976 Tony Award for Best Choreography – A Chorus Line
1979 Drama Desk Award for Outstanding Choreography – Ballroom
1979 Tony Award for Best Choreography – Ballroom
1997 Laurence Olivier Award for Best Choreography – Martin Guerre

Nominations
1979 Tony Award for Best Musical – Ballroom
1982 Drama Desk Award for Outstanding Musical – Dreamgirls
1982 Tony Award for Best Musical – Dreamgirls
1991 Tony Award for Best Choreography – Miss Saigon
1995 Tony Award for Best Choreography – Sunset Boulevard

References

 
Kelly, Kevin(1990),One Singular Sensation: The Michael Bennett Story, Zebra, 
Mandelbaum, Ken (1990), A Chorus Line and the Musicals of Michael Bennett,  St. Martins Press, 
Stevens, Gary (2000), The Longest Line: Broadway's Most Singular Sensation: A Chorus Line, Applause Books, 
Flinn, Denny Martin (1989), What They Did for Love: The Untold Story Behind the Making of "A Chorus Line", Bantam, 
Viagas, Robert (1990), On the Line - The Creation of A Chorus Line, Limelight Editions,

External links
 
 

1937 births
2021 deaths
American theatre directors
American choreographers
American theatre managers and producers
American male dancers
American people of Armenian descent
Drama Desk Award winners
Film directors from New York City
Tony Award winners
LGBT people from New York (state)
LGBT theatre directors
21st-century American LGBT people